EET or eet may refer to:

 EET (library), a software library
 Eet (symbol) (⊥), a mathematical symbol
 "Eet" (song), a song from Regina Spektor's album Far
 Eastern European Time, (UTC+2)
 EE Technologies, an American electronics manufacturing company
 EE Times, an electronics industry magazine
 Electrical engineering technology
 Electronic energy transfer
 Epoxyeicosatrienoic acid
 Extra element theorem
 School of Engineering of Terrassa, in Spain
 Shelby County Airport (Alabama)
KEET, PBS member television station in Eureka, California
 EET, expected execution time (in Information technology and System Operation)